Kenneth Miller Adams (1897 – 1966) was an American artist.

Life 
He studied at the Art Institute of Chicago and the Art Students League.
He served in the U.S. Army in World War I. 
In 1924, he moved to Taos, New Mexico. He was a member of the Taos Society of Artists. In 1933, he worked for the Treasury Relief Art Project and the Public Works of Art Project, federal arts programs of the United States Department of the Treasury. In 1937 he was commissioned by the Section of Painting and Sculpture to create murals for the U.S. post offices in Goodland, Kansas, and Deming, New Mexico.

In 1938, he moved to Albuquerque when he was awarded a Carnegie Corporation grant as the first artist-in-residence at the University of New Mexico. He later taught at the University of New Mexico until he retired in 1963. 
In 1961, he was elected to the National Academy of Design. He was commissioned by James F. Zimmerman, president of the university, to create a mural for the university library called The Three Peoples, to include the Hispanic, Native American and non-indigenous citizens. Some have considered the final panel of the four as racist because of placement of the Hispanic and Native American figures outside of the central figure in the final mural, but they are all included. The central figure has been vandalized twice, and then restored.

His work is in the Smithsonian American Art Museum, New Mexico Museum of Art, Colorado Springs Fine Art Center, Anschutz collection, the Fred Jones Museum of Art, University of Oklahoma.
His papers are held at the Archives of American Art.

References

Further reading
William H. Gerdts, Art across America: two centuries of regional painting, 1710–1920, Volume 3, Abbeville Press, 1991,  
Mary Carroll Nelson, The legendary artists of Taos, Watson-Guptill Publications, 1980,

External links
Annexgalleries.com
Askart.com

1897 births
1966 deaths
Artists from Topeka, Kansas
20th-century American painters
American male painters
School of the Art Institute of Chicago alumni
Art Students League of New York alumni
University of New Mexico alumni
Taos Society of Artists
United States Army personnel of World War I
Public Works of Art Project artists
Section of Painting and Sculpture artists
20th-century American printmakers
National Academy of Design members
20th-century American male artists